Kastriot Kastrati (born 10 February 1993) is a Finnish footballer of Albanian descent currently playing for Finnish Veikkausliiga side PK-35 Vantaa.

Kastrati scored two goals in 2011-12 UEFA Champions League qualifying match against Bangor City.

In 2011 season he also scored 20 goals in 13 matches in Kakkonen for Klubi-04. After that, he went on loan to FC Haka to make his Veikkausliiga debut. On 5 April 2012, he was loaned back to Haka, on a season-long loan. Kastrati was chosen to the Veikkausliiga team of the Month for May 2013 while playing in FC Honka.

International career
Kastrati scored his Finland national under-21 team debut goal when Finland beat Wales U-21 5–1 in 2015 UEFA European Under-21 Football Championship qualification 14 August 2013.

References

External links
  Kastriot Kastrati at Soccerway
  Profile at veikkausliiga.com
  Veikkausliiga Hall of Fame

1993 births
Living people
Finnish footballers
Helsingin Jalkapalloklubi players
FC Haka players
FC Honka players
Veikkausliiga players
Finnish people of Kosovan descent
Klubi 04 players
FC Viikingit players
Association football forwards
Footballers from Helsinki